Tapan Chowdhury (born 7 January) is a Bangladeshi musician. He is a former member of the musical group Souls and is known for his modern (Adhunik) songs. He won Best Male Singer in 1st Meril-Prothom Alo Awards in 1998.

Career
Chowdhury was trained by Ustad Priyadaranjan Sen, Ustad Mihirlala and Pandit Sanjit Dey. He started his career with Souls and worked for the band for 22 years. Later, he started to work as a solo singer. He performed as a playback singer for more than 300 films.

Souls

Tapan Chowdhury joined Souls towards the end of 1973, after Naquib Khan joined the band. Tapan Chowdhury was one of the biggest contributor to Souls, being the main vocalist of the first five album, rendering his voice to countless hits, Mon Shudhu Mon Chuyeche, E Emon Porichoy and more.

Discography

Solo
 Tapan Chowdhury
 Arajita
 Anushochona
 Tumi Nil Akash
 Sritir Chinnoh
 Amar Prithibi
 Aj Fire Na Gelei Ki Noy
 Biroho
 Ei Rupali Chade
 Dome Jibon Dome Moron
 Ami Shob Kichu Charte Pari
 Mon Poboner Nau
 Hiyar Majhe Praner Manush (Rabindra Sangeet)

Duet
 Tumi Amar Prothom Shokal
 Nishhashe Tumi, Bishaashe Tumi
 Amar Akashe

Band

 Super Souls (1982)
 কলেজের করিডোরে (In the Corridors of College) (1985)
 "মানুষ মাটির কাছাকাছি (People are Close to the Ground) (1986)
 East & West (1988)
 এ এমন পরিচয় (It's Such an Identity) (1993)

Mixed
 Bitrishna Jibon Amar
 Kichhui Naki Daini Tomay
 Joy Porajoy

Compilation
 Best of Tapan Chowdhury

References

Living people
Year of birth missing (living people)
Bangladeshi Hindus
20th-century Bangladeshi male singers
20th-century Bangladeshi singers
Best Male Singer Meril-Prothom Alo Award winners
21st-century Bangladeshi male singers
21st-century Bangladeshi singers